Red rice is a variety of rice that is colored red by its anthocyanin content. It is usually eaten unpolished or partially polished, and has a red bran layer, rather than the more common pale brown. Red rice has a nutty flavor. It has the highest nutritional value among rices eaten with the bran intact.. Some red rice has a low glycemic index. The rice will be slowly digested and energy will be slowly released. This will cause a slower increase in blood sugar levels. Red rice contains high antioxidant levels that reduce free radicals in the organism. It is also a richer source of iron, magnesium, calcium and zinc than white rice.

Varieties
Varieties of red rice include:

 Rakthashali, a rare rice variety of Indian rice, often mentioned in  Ayurveda and  Hinduism
 Oryza longistaminata, also known as red rice
 Oryza punctata, also known as red rice
 Oryza rufipogon, also known as wild rice and red rice
 Red rice, also known as weedy rice, a low-yielding rice variety that persists as a weed in fields of better-quality rice
 Thai Red Cargo rice, a non-glutinous long grain rice variety
 Bhutanese red rice, a medium-grain rice grown in the Kingdom of Bhutan in the eastern Himalayas
 Camargue red rice, a relatively new variety of rice cultivated in the wetlands of the Camargue region of southern France
 Matta rice Kerala Matta rice, also known as Rosematta rice, Palakkadan Matta rice, Kerala Red rice, and Red parboiled rice, is an indigenous variety of rice grown in Palakkad District of Kerala. It is popular in Kerala and Sri Lanka, where it is used for idlies and appams, and eaten plain.Matta rice is mostly eaten in Kerala and in Dakshina Kannada and Udupi district of Karnataka state, India. Some natives of these region settled elsewhere also prefer Matta rice as staple food.
 Ulikan or mini-angan, heirloom red rice from Ifugao and Kalinga, Philippines
 Arroz da terra, an heirloom red rice cultivated in Northeastern Brazil (States of Rio Grande do Norte and Paraíba) since the 16th century.
 Malaysia red rice varieties are Udang Besar, Udang Halus, Katek Merah, Silah Merah, MRQ98, MRQ99, MRQ 100 and UKMRC-9. UKMRC-9 is the new red rice varieties in Malaysia, developed through plant breeding program.

Dishes
 Red Rice, a traditional Gullah Lowcountry dish, similar to West African jollof rice.

See also

 Wehani rice, a variety of aromatic brown rice developed in the late 20th century
 Red yeast rice, white rice fermented with a red mold, used in East Asian cuisine and Chinese traditional medicine, with anti-cholesterol properties 
  Some of the Asian liquors known as arrack are made by fermentation of red rice.
Matta rice mostly used in Kerala and in Dakshina Kannada and Udupi district of Karnataka state, India.

References

Rice varieties